This list of cemeteries in California includes currently operating, historical (closed for new interments), and defunct (graves abandoned or removed) cemeteries, columbaria, and mausolea which are historical and/or notable. It does not include pet cemeteries.

Ashley County 
 Bethel Cemetery, near Crossett
 Hamburg Cemetery, Hamburg; NRHP-listed

Baxter County 
 Wolf Cemetery; NRHP-listed

Benton County 
 Benton County Poor Farm Cemetery, Bentonville; NRHP-listed
 Mt. Hebron M.E. Church South and Cemetery, Colville; NRHP-listed
 Putman Cemetery, Bentonville; NRHP-listed

Calhoun County 
 Hampton Cemetery, Arkansas, Hampton; NRHP-listed

Carroll County 
 Carroll County Poor Farm Cemetery, near Pleasant Valley; NRHP-listed
 Eureka Springs Cemetery, Eureka Springs; NRHP-listed

Chicot County 
 Harden Family Cemetery, near Jennie; NRHP-listed
 New Hope Missionary Baptist Church Cemetery, Lake Village; NRHP-listed

Clark County 
 Rose Hill Cemetery, Arkadelphia; NRHP-listed

Clay County 
 County Home Cemetery, Piggott; NRHP-listed
 Scatterville Cemetery, near Rector; NRHP-listed

Cleburne County 
 Cleburne County Farm Cemetery, Heber Springs; NRHP-listed
 Mike Meyer Disfarmer Gravesite, Heber Springs; NRHP-listed

Conway County 
 Bold Pilgrim Cemetery, Morrilton; NRHP-listed

Crawford County 
 Fairview Cemetery, Van Buren; NRHP-listed

Dallas County 
 Hampton Springs Cemetery, near Carthage; NRHP-listed
 Princeton Cemetery, Princeton; NRHP-listed
 Tulip Cemetery, Tulip; NRHP-listed

Desha County 
 Mound Cemetery, Arkansas City; NRHP-listed
 Trippe Holly Grove Cemetery, McGehee; NRHP-listed

Drew County 
 Rough and Ready Cemetery, near Monticello; NRHP-listed
 Saline Cemetery, Allis; NRHP-listed

Faulkner County 
 Hardy Cemetery, Centerville; NRHP-listed
 Oak Grove Cemetery, Conway; NRHP-listed

Franklin County 
 Singleton Family Cemetery, Charleston; NRHP-listed

Garland County 
 Belding-Gaines Cemetery, near Hot Springs; NRHP-listed
 Buckville Cemetery, near Hot Springs; NRHP-listed
 Hollywood Cemetery, Hot Springs; NRHP-listed

Hempstead County 
 Mounds Cemetery, Columbus; NRHP-listed

Hot Springs County 
 Rockport Cemetery, Rockport; NRHP-listed

Howard County 
 Old Corinth Cemetery, near Center Point; NRHP-listed

Independence County 
 Akron Cemetery, near Newark; NRHP-listed
 Walnut Grove Cemetery, Cord; NRHP-listed

Izard County 
 Jeffery Cemetery, near Mount Olive; NRHP-listed
 Vest Cemetery, near Boswell hamlet; NRHP-listed

Jefferson County 
 Antioch Missionary Baptist Church Cemetery, Sherrill; NRHP-listed
 Camp White Sulphur Springs Confederate Cemetery, near Sulphur Springs
 St. Peter's Cemetery, near Pine Bluff

Lafayette County 
 Conway Cemetery State Park, near Bradley; NRHP-listed

Lawrence County 
 Bethel Cemetery, near Denton; NRHP-listed
 Mount Zion Cemetery, Walnut Ridge; NRHP-listed
 Scott Cemetery, Walnut Ridge; NRHP-listed

Lincoln County 
 Rice Family Cemetery, Varner; NRHP-listed

Little River County 
 Mills Cemetery, Wilton; NRHP-listed

Lonoke County 
 Camp Nelson Confederate Cemetery, near Cabot; NRHP-listed

Miller County 
 Old Rondo Cemetery, Rondo; NRHP-listed

Mississippi County 
 Garden Point Cemetery, Etowah; NRHP-listed
 Violet Cemetery, Osceola; NRHP-listed

Nevada County 
 Ephesus Cemetery, Emmet; NRHP-listed
 Moscow Methodist Church and Cemetery, Prescott; NRHP-listed
 Prescott City Cemetery, Prescott; NRHP-listed

Ouachita County 
 Green Cemetery near Stephens; NRHP-listed
 Oakland Cemetery, Camden; NRHP-listed

Phillips County 
 Helena Confederate Cemetery, Helena; NRHP-listed
 Maple Hill Cemetery, Helena; NRHP-listed
 Temple Beth El Cemetery, Helena; NRHP-listed

Pope County 
 Norristown Cemetery, Russellville; NRHP-listed

Prairie County 
 Oak Grove Cemetery, Des Arc; NRHP-listed

Pulaski County 
 Frenchman's Mountain Methodist Episcopal Church-South and Cemetery, Cato; NRHP-listed
 Little Rock National Cemetery, Little Rock; NRHP-listed
 Martin Cemetery, Little Rock; NRHP-listed
 McCraw Cemetery, Jacksonville; NRHP-listed
 Mount Holly Cemetery, Little Rock; NRHP-listed
 Oakland-Fraternal Cemetery, Little Rock; NRHP-listed
 Pyeatte-Mason Cemetery, Maumelle; NRHP-listed

Randolph County 
 Campbell Cemetery, near Imboden; NRHP-listed

Saint Francis County 
 Scott Bond Family Plot, Madison; NRHP-listed

Sebastian County 
 Elmwood Cemetery, Fort Smith; NRHP-listed 
 Fort Smith National Cemetery, Fort Smith; NRHP-listed
 Oak Cemetery, Fort Smith; NRHP-listed

Sharp County 
 Hardy Cemetery, Hardy; NRHP-listed

Union County 
 Scotland Cemetery, near Junction City; NRHP-listed

Washington County 
 Bean Cemetery, Lincoln; NRHP-listed
 Bethlehem Cemetery, near Canehill; NRHP-listed 
 Black Oak Cemetery, near Greenland; NRHP-listed 
 Cane Hill Cemetery, Canehill; NRHP-listed 
 Evergreen Cemetery, Fayetteville
 Fayetteville Confederate Cemetery, Fayetteville
 Fayetteville National Cemetery, Fayetteville; NRHP-listed
 Prairie Grove Cemetery, Prairie Grove; NRHP-listed
 Stokenbury Cemetery, Elkins; NRHP-listed
 Walker Family Plot, Fayetteville; NRHP-listed

White County 
 Fredonia Cemetery; NRHP-listed
 Mount Olive-Bedford Chapel Cemetery, near Mount Vernon; NRHP-listed

Woodruff County 
 Augusta Memorial Park, Augusta; NRHP-listed

Yell County 
 Brearley Cemetery, Dardanelle
 Sulphur Springs Cemetery, Sulphur Springs; NRHP-listed

See also
 List of cemeteries in the United States
Pioneer cemetery

References

Arkansas